When All Else Fails... is the second vinyl LP by 16-17, released in 1989 through Vision. It is the second full-length vinyl album of the band.

Reception
The Dusted Magazine writer Doug Mosurock reviews: "By the time of 1989’s When All Else Fails LP, 16-17 had become, unbelievably, even more aggressive, this time as a result of Kneubühler adding new technologies and a whole palette of unconventional sound-generating devices to his setup. The approach here is positively industrial at times, as on “Pedestrian Dub,” where sax and guitar are infused with enveloped, processed barbs that make each bleat and downstroke sound like wavering sheet metal, and Remond’s shell tones all the more alien. The cyclic rhythms of their earlier work reappear on “Who Planned All This?” and “Clap Trap,” but the rictus of dance rhythms and the drive to innovate moved the band beyond earlier works..."

Track listing

Personnel 
Adapted from the When All Else Fails... LP liner notes.
Musicians:
16-17
Alex Buess – saxophones, electronics, vocals, oboe 
Knut Remond – drums, percussion, electronic shaker, 
Markus Kneubühler – guitar, synths, electronics

 Production
Tracks 2, 4, 5 & 6 recorded live on 9/12/1988 at restaurant Hirscheneck, Basel, on a 4-track recorder
Tracks 1 & 3 recorded live on 31/3/1989 at the Kulturfabrik, Wetzikon, on a simple cassette tape deck.
Mixed at the Wolf 2.8.1. studios in Basel.

16-17 – mastering
Markus Kneubühler– Artwork
Alex Buess – engineer

Release history

References 

1989 live albums
16-17 live albums